Stephen Llewellyn Hanson (8 July 1931 – 27 June 1997) was a South African cricketer who played first-class cricket for Orange Free State from 1950 to 1959.

Hanson was an opening batsman and off-spin bowler. He captained Orange Free State from 1954–55 to 1956–57. In their only Currie Cup victory in this period, in January 1956, he scored 22 and 70 (Orange Free State's highest score in the match) and took 3 for 39 in the second innings, including the final wicket, to give his team an 80-run victory over Griqualand West.

His best season was 1954–55, when he scored his two first-class centuries. Orange Free State struggled in the "A" Section of the Currie Cup, losing five and drawing one of their six matches, but Hanson led their batting with 472 runs at an average of 39.33. Against Natal at Bloemfontein, he top-scored in each innings with 72 and 134; in the second innings he added 161 for the seventh wicket with the 16-year-old Peter Carlstein, who was making his first-class debut.

References

External links

1931 births
1997 deaths
South African cricketers
Free State cricketers